Kole Lind (born October 16, 1998) is a Canadian professional ice hockey player currently playing for the Coachella Valley Firebirds in the American Hockey League (AHL) while under contract to the Seattle Kraken of the National Hockey League (NHL).

Early life
Lind was born on October 16, 1998, in Swift Current, Saskatchewan, Canada to parents Ashley and Marcia. Lind's father Ashley grew up playing minor hockey alongside Hayley Wickenheiser before running a farm in Admiral, Saskatchewan. Beyond his father, his sisters Taylor and Tenelle played collegiate ice hockey while his younger brother was drafted into the Western Hockey League.

Playing career
Growing up in Saskatchewan, Lind played minor ice hockey for the Swift Current Legionnaires of the Saskatchewan Male U18 AAA Hockey League (SMAAAHL) and for the Swift Current Kabos Bantam AA Raiders. He tallied 46 points during the 2012–13 regular season with the Raiders and was subsequently drafted by the Kelowna Rockets in the 2013 Western Hockey League bantam draft. Following the draft, he joined the Saskatoon Contacts for the 2013–14 SMAAAHL season and represented Saskatchewan at the 2013 Western Canada Under 16 Challenge Cup. Upon returning from the tournament, Lind finished the season with the Contacts and tallied 21 goals and 16 assists for 37 points through 44 games.

Lind returned to the Contacts for the 2014–15 season where he broke out offensively and accumulated 45 goals and 34 assists for 79 points through 44 games. As such, Lind was named their 2014 Player of the Month in November and was named to the league's 2014–15 First Team All-Star. Once the SMAAAHL season was finished, Lind played six regular-season games with the Rockets and seven playoff games. He tallied his first WHL playoff point with an assist Tomas Soustal’s third period goal to help them beat the Victoria Royals in Game 1.

Major junior
Following his short stint with the Rockets during the 2014–15 season, Lind began his first full-length WHL campaign during the 2015–16 season. During the pre-season, Lind and Dillon Dube led their team in pre-season scoring with six points each. He began his rookie campaign playing alongside Dube and Tyson Baillie and quickly recorded his first career WHL hat-trick by December 2015. Lind finished his rookie season with 41 points through 70 games while going goalless in his last 30 games. Upon finishing his rookie season, Lind spent the 2016 offseason in Florida working with a skills coach on training and power skating.

Upon returning to the Rockets for his sophomore season, Lind entered his first year of draft eligibility strong and quickly set new career highs. He played alongside Dube and Tomas Soustal became the team leader in both points and goals while also tying Cal Foote for most assists. Lind finished the 2016–17 season with 30 goals and 87 points through 70 regular-season games while also recording six goals and six assists in 17 playoff contests. His point totals placed him fourth amongst first-time draft-eligible WHL forwards while his points per game ranked him fifth amongst that same peer group. As a result, Lind was ranked 23rd among North American skaters eligible for the 2017 NHL Entry Draft by Central Scouting and earned praise from International Scouting Services for his "high end" vision and skill-set. Lind was eventually drafted 33rd overall by the Vancouver Canucks on the second day of the 2017 NHL Entry Draft. Following the draft, Lind was invited to attend the Canucks' Summer Development Camp.

After attending the Canucks' Development Camp, Lind returned to the Rockets for his third and final major junior season. He began the 2017–18 season with 11 goals and 21 assists through 20 games before missing over six games while recovering from mononucleosis. Despite missing numerous games, Lind remained the team's scoring leader. As such, he was invited to participate in Team Canada's 2018 World Junior Ice Hockey Championships tryouts but was cut before the final roster was announced. After being cut from Team Canada's roster, Lind returned to the Rockets and tallied eight points in three games. One of these games included his second career hat-trick to lift the Rockets over the Kamloops Blazers.

Professional career

Vancouver Canucks
On March 1, 2018, Lind signed a three-year entry-level contract with the Canucks and agreed to an amateur tryout agreement with their American Hockey League (AHL) affiliate, the Utica Comets, at the end of the 2017–18 season. Upon joining the Comets, Lind appeared in six games where he registered one assist. Following this, Lind attended the Canucks 2018–19 season development camp but was returned to the Comets for his first full professional campaign. He played six games with the Comets before suffering an injury during a game against the Syracuse Crunch. Lind returned to the lineup on November 28 and tallied his first professional goal on January 16 against the Crunch.

In the pandemic delayed 2020–21 season, Lind was assigned to the Utica Comets and posted 8 points in his first eight games, before suffering a broken nose when struck in the face during a game against the Rochester Americans on March 3, 2021.  After being cleared medically, he was assigned to the Canucks’ taxi squad on April 1, 2021. He made his NHL debut with the Canucks in a 4–1 defeat to the Toronto Maple Leafs on April 29, 2021.

Seattle Kraken
On July 21, 2021, Lind was selected from the Canucks at the 2021 NHL Expansion Draft by the Seattle Kraken. Lind was originally assigned to their AHL affiliate, the Charlotte Checkers, before being recalled on October 13 due to injuries in the lineup. During his call-up, Lind tallied his first NHL assist and recorded two hits in a 4–3 win over the Edmonton Oilers on December 4. He remained with the Kraken and later scored his first career NHL goal on April 1, 2022, in a 5–2 loss to the Vegas Golden Knights.

As a restricted free agent in the off-season, Lind was tendered a qualifying offer and signed to a one-year, two-way contract extension with the Kraken on July 21, 2022.

Career statistics

References

External links

1998 births
Charlotte Checkers (2010–) players
Coachella Valley Firebirds players
Ice hockey people from Saskatchewan
Kelowna Rockets players
Living people
Seattle Kraken players
Utica Comets players
Vancouver Canucks draft picks
Vancouver Canucks players